United Nations Security Council Resolution 1681, adopted unanimously on May 31, 2006, after reaffirming all resolutions on the situation between Eritrea and Ethiopia, particularly resolutions 1320 (2000), 1430 (2003), 1466 (2003), 1640 (2005) and 1678 (2006), the Council extended the mandate of the United Nations Mission in Ethiopia and Eritrea (UNMEE) until September 30, 2006, and cut its size by a third.

Resolution

Observations
The Security Council reaffirmed its support for the peace process between the two countries and the full implementation of the Algiers Agreement and decision of the Eritrea-Ethiopia Boundary Commission (EEBC) which was important for lasting peace in the region.

It reaffirmed the integrity of and respect for the Temporary Security Zone (TSZ) and called for both Ethiopia and Eritrea to provide and assist UNMEE with necessary access, assistance, support and protection. Council members thanked countries that had contributed troops to UNMEE and welcomed the intention of the Secretary-General Kofi Annan to keep the operation under review.

Acts
The mandate of UNMEE was extended by four months, according to the resolution, which further approved the reconfiguration of UNMEE's military component to deploy 2,300 troops including 230 military observers; this was a reduction from 3,500.  As with previous resolutions on the matter, it demanded compliance with Resolution 1640 and that Ethiopia and Eritrea provide necessary access, assistance, support and protection to the peacekeeping operation.

Meanwhile, the Council called on all parties to fully co-operate with the EEBC in the demarcation process. The international community was requested to provide continued support for UNMEE and contributions towards the trust fund established in Resolution 1177 (1998).

Finally, the Secretary-General was asked to provide updates on the situation.

See also
 Badme
 Eritrean–Ethiopian War
 List of United Nations Security Council Resolutions 1601 to 1700 (2005–2006)

References

External links
 
Text of the Resolution at undocs.org

 1681
2006 in Eritrea
2006 in Ethiopia
 1681
 1681
Eritrea–Ethiopia border
May 2006 events